Tomai may refer to several places:

Tomai, a commune in Gagauzia
Tomai, a commune in Leova District
 Tomai Station, a railway station in Ninohe, Iwate Prefecture, Japan